Antonio Rivas Martínez (born 13 September 1965) is a Spanish retired footballer who played as a central defender, and a manager. He is the current youth football director of Real Oviedo.

Playing career
Rivas was born in Alcázar de San Juan, Province of Ciudad Real. After an unsuccessful four-year stint with Atlético Madrid, only appearing in four games with the first team, he signed in 1988 with RCD Mallorca, being regularly used during his only season as the Balearic Islands club returned to La Liga after one year out.

Subsequently, Rivas joined Real Oviedo, going on to play nine consecutive campaigns in the top flight and rarely missing a match when healthy, while being deployed in several defensive positions. In 1990–91, he contributed 36 appearances to help the Asturias side qualify to the UEFA Cup. In 1994–95, he scored a career-high five goals for another comfortable midtable finish (ninth).

After 274 competitive games with Oviedo, the 33-year-old Rivas left the club in the 1999 January transfer window, representing Albacete Balompié over one and a half Segunda División seasons. He closed out his career in Segunda División B, after one year with Benidorm CF.

Coaching career
Rivas started coaching in 2002–03, being one of four managers as Oviedo were relegated to the third division – eventually to Tercera División due to irregularities. Two years later, he led them to promotion to that level.

In 2007, Rivas returned to his first professional team Atlético Madrid to take charge of the youth system. After two years, he was appointed at their reserves in division three, leading them to the seventh position in his debut campaign. He continued to work in lower-league and amateur football the following seasons, with CF Fuenlabrada and AD Alcorcón B.

Rivas rejoined Atlético's youths in 2017, winning the national championship of that category in his fourth season. He was appointed again at the B team on 6 April 2021, not being able to avoid relegation from the third tier. 

On 22 June 2021, Rivas was named academy director at Oviedo.

Personal life
Rivas is the father of the twins Mario and Óscar, both footballers. The former is a forward and the latter is also a central defender.

References

External links

1965 births
Living people
Sportspeople from the Province of Ciudad Real
Spanish footballers
Footballers from Castilla–La Mancha
Association football defenders
La Liga players
Segunda División players
Segunda División B players
CF Gimnástico Alcázar players
Atlético Madrid B players
Atlético Madrid footballers
RCD Mallorca players
Real Oviedo players
Albacete Balompié players
Benidorm CF footballers
Spanish football managers
Segunda División managers
Segunda División B managers
Tercera División managers
Real Oviedo managers
Atlético Madrid B managers
CF Fuenlabrada managers